The United States competed at the 1973 World Aquatics Championships in Belgrade, Yugoslavia from August 31 to September 9.

Medalists

Diving

Swimming

Men

 Legend: (*) = Swimmers who participated in the heat only.

Women

 Legend: (*) = Swimmers who participated in the heat only.

References

Competition results

World Aquatics Championships
Nations at the 1973 World Aquatics Championships
1973